Henrique Melmann (born 24 April 1931) is a Brazilian water polo player. He competed in the men's tournament at the 1952 Summer Olympics.

See also
 Brazil men's Olympic water polo team records and statistics
 List of men's Olympic water polo tournament goalkeepers

References

External links
 

1931 births
Living people
Brazilian male water polo players
Water polo goalkeepers
Olympic water polo players of Brazil
Water polo players at the 1952 Summer Olympics
Sportspeople from Recife
20th-century Brazilian people